Francis Yaw Ofori (popularly known as Baba Spirit) (died 8 September 2022) was a Ghanaian comedian, comic actor, MC and media personality. In 2017, he made headlines in the media when he proposed to fight Ayittey Powers in a boxing match.

Career 
He began his career as an actor and shot to fame in 2017. He was the former host of 'Broken News' on Adom TV. In 2018, he fought Ayittey Powers in a boxing fight at the Bukom Boxing Arena in Accra which was publicized. He also featured in a music video by Dada Hafco.

Death 
He died on Thursday 8 September 2022. He was diagnosed with low blood count. He died from an illness in the Ashanti Region after he was admitted in Kotoku hospital. He died at 41.

References 

20th-century births
2022 deaths
Ghanaian comedians